Yoo Jae-hoon (Hangul: 유재훈; born 7 July 1984) is a South Korean former professional footballer as a goalkeeper.

Career 
He was the main goalkeeper for Persipura Jayapura from 2010 until 2014 season before he finally returned to the club in the 2016 season.

Honours 
Persipura Jayapura
 Indonesia Super League: 2010–11, 2013
 Indonesian Inter Island Cup: 2011
 Indonesia Soccer Championship A: 2016

Individual
 Indonesia Super League Best goalkepper: 2013

References

External links 
 

1983 births
Living people
South Korean footballers
Association football goalkeepers
South Korean expatriate footballers
Daejeon Hana Citizen FC players
Persipura Jayapura players
Bali United F.C. players
K League 1 players
Liga 1 (Indonesia) players
Indonesian Super League-winning players
South Korean expatriate sportspeople in Indonesia
Expatriate footballers in Indonesia
Sportspeople from Ulsan